The Aliʻi of Koʻolau were the rulers of Koʻolau Range on the island of Oahu, in ancient Hawaii. Ancient Hawaiians believed that the Chiefs of Koʻolau were the descendants of the god named Wākea. Chiefs could have different noble ranks; those who were born from the unions of full siblings had the highest known rank. The first ruler of Koʻolau was High Chief Kalehenui.

List 

Kalehenui — child of Maweke (a wizard from Tahiti)
Hinakaimauliʻawa (female) — child of Kalehenui and Kahinalo
Mualani (female) — child of Hinakaimauliʻawa and Kahiwakaʻapu
Kua-o-Mua — child of Mualani and Kaomealani I
Kawalewaleoku — child of Kua-o-Mua and his sister, Kapua-a-Mua; considered a deity
Kaulaulaokalani — child of Kawalewaleoku and Unaʻula
Kaimihauoku (female) — child of Kaulaulaokalani and Kalua-i-Olowalu
Moku-o-Loe — son of Kaimihauoku 
Kalia-o-kalani (Kahoakalani-o-Moku) — child of Moku, and husband of Kua-a-ʻohe 
Ke-opu-o-lani (Kupualani) — consort of Kaohi-a-kanaka
Kupanihi — husband of Kahua-o-kalani
Lua-poluku — son of Kupanihi, and husband of Mumu-ka-lani-ohua
Ahu-kai
Maʻe-nui-o-kalani
Kapikiʻo-kalani
Holaulani (Kauaohalaulani) (female)
Laninui-a-Kaʻihupeʻe
Hoalani 
Ipuwai-o-Hoalani (female)

See also 
Ancient Hawaii
Aliʻi

References 

Hawaiian chiefs